Fulton Creek is a stream in the U.S. state of Ohio.

Fulton Creek was named for one Mr. Fulton, a pioneer who disappeared near this creek and was not heard from again, despite an extensive search.

See also
List of rivers of Ohio

References

Rivers of Delaware County, Ohio
Rivers of Union County, Ohio
Rivers of Ohio